Diapalpus is a genus of moths in the family Lasiocampidae. The genus was erected by Strand in 1913.

Species
Diapalpus axiologa Hering, 1932
Diapalpus congregarius Strand, 1913
Diapalpus griseus Hering, 1941

References

Lasiocampidae